Gries Pass (2469 m.) (Italian: Passo del Gries, German: Griespass) is a mountain pass between 	Valais, Switzerland and Formazza, Italy. There is no road over the pass, from Nufenen Pass the paved road ends and a bridle path leads over to the Italian side. A high pressure gas pipeline runs over the pass, coming from the North Sea to Italy.

See also
 List of mountain passes
List of mountain passes in Switzerland

External links
Webshots.com: Gries Pass photos

Mountain passes of Valais
Mountain passes of Piedmont
Mountain passes of the Alps
Italy–Switzerland border crossings
Lepontine Alps